"Shadow Days" is the lead single from American singer John Mayer's fifth studio album Born and Raised. It had moderate success, peaking at #42 in the United States and #49 in Canada.

Music video
The music video for "Shadow Days" premiered on Vevo and YouTube on April 27, 2012. The video shows John Mayer in three places. One of them shows him walking around the countryside. Another one shows him walking in the cold forests of Idaho. The last one shows him driving in a car taking stops along Idaho highways and repairing his guitar in a local music store then proceeding to an unknown destination. He sings and plays the guitar in all three places at some point.

Personnel
John Mayer - vocals, acoustic, electric & resophonic guitars
Aaron Sterling - drums, tambourine
Sean Hurley - bass guitar
Chuck Leavell - piano, Hammond B-3
Greg Leisz - pedal steel

Charts

Weekly charts

Year-end charts

Release history

References

External links
 
 

John Mayer songs
2012 singles
2012 songs
Music videos directed by Philip Andelman
Songs written by John Mayer
Song recordings produced by Don Was